The Socialist Democratic Unionist Party (PUDS) is an Arab nationalist political party in Mauritania. As of 2013, the party is led by Mahfouz Ould al-Aziz.

History
The party was founded on 20 September 1994 by a mixture of Arab nationalists and members of a secret Ba'ath party association in Mauritania. The party name was inspired by the slogan of the Ba'ath party: "Unity, Liberty, Socialism," because Mauritanian electoral law prevents a party's from sharing the name of non-Mauritanian parties. The party's first conference, held in Noukachott on 11 July 2010, was attended by Abdullah al-Ahmar, the Assistant Secretary General of the National Command of the Arab Socialist Ba'ath Party.

The party won a seat in the 19 November and 3 December 2006 elections.

Ideology
The party has strongly supported the Syrian government throughout the Syrian Civil War, and is a member of the National Front of Mauritania; an association of other Mauritanian parties supportive of the Syrian government. The other parties in the Front include the Socialist Party, the Popular Front movement, the Welfare Party, the Social Democratic Party, and the Reform Party.

The party slogan is "Unity, Democracy, Socialism."

References

Arab nationalism in Mauritania
Ba'athist parties
Socialist parties in Mauritania
Social democratic parties